Axestoleus is a genus of beetles in the family Cerambycidae, containing the following species:

 Axestoleus meridionalis (Bates, 1880)
 Axestoleus quinquepunctatus Bates, 1892

References

Trachyderini
Cerambycidae genera